Jarno Trulli (born 13 July 1974) is an Italian racing driver. He regularly competed in Formula One from 1997 to 2011, driving for Minardi, Prost, Jordan, Renault, Toyota, Lotus Racing and Team Lotus.

Throughout his Formula One career, Trulli was renowned for his skill in qualifying, regularly achieving far better grid positions than rivals with superior cars to his own. He was also known for his defensive driving style which allowed him to successfully hold off quicker drivers, sometimes for an entire race. The combination of being able to achieve high grid positions in comparatively slow cars and his ability to hold off faster drivers would often result in a line of vehicles forming behind him during a race, which was commonly referred to as the 'Trulli Train' by commentators, fans and journalists.

Trulli was slated to compete in the 2012 Formula One season, but retired before the season began. In 2014–15 he competed in the inaugural season of the FIA Formula E Championship, driving for Trulli GP, a team he founded. He is the father of racing driver Enzo Trulli.

Career

Early career and junior formulae
His parents were motorsport fans and named their son after Jarno Saarinen, the Finnish Grand Prix motorcycle racing champion who was killed at Monza in 1973. He started racing in karts at an early age; after winning the Karting World Championship in 1991, the Italian karting championship and several other karting championships in different categories up to 1995, Trulli won the German Formula Three Championship in 1996.

Formula One

Minardi and Prost (1997–1999)

In 1997, Trulli made his debut in Formula One with Minardi. After 7 races he replaced the injured Olivier Panis at Prost and impressed immediately, finishing fourth in Germany and even leading in Austria, looking set to finish second until his engine blew. He stayed at the Prost team for the next two seasons and eventually scored his first podium in wet conditions at the 1999 European Grand Prix. However, this was a rare highlight in a race few of the main front-runners finished, and the poor performance of the Prost team convinced him that a switch to Jordan would bring improved results.

Jordan (2000–2001)

In  he moved to the Irish squad, but the team was no longer the force it had been in the late 1990s. In his two years with Jordan, Trulli failed to score a podium, but did impress with a series of brilliant qualifying displays. During this period suggestions were made that Trulli was more of a qualifying specialist than an out-and-out fast race driver, a charge he frequently denied.

Renault (2002–2004)

Alongside Jenson Button, he often outqualified his British teammate, but was generally shaded in races. Regardless of Button's improved pace that season, it was Trulli who stayed at Renault for 2003 to partner promoted test-driver Fernando Alonso. The 2003 Renault was a strong car and in Alonso's hands won in Hungary. Trulli struggled to attain similar results, but did achieve a podium in Germany, his first since leaving Prost.

For the first half of the season he was the better of the two Renault drivers, racking up regular points and podiums. At Monaco he finally took his only victory after a brilliant display from pole position. Having performed so well, the Italian was eager to stick with the team for 2005, but his relationship with team-boss Briatore soured. A last corner error which allowed Ferrari's Rubens Barrichello onto the podium in France enraged the team, and from that point his days with the French manufacturer were numbered. He did not score any points after the French Grand Prix and was consistently off the pace during races. He later accused the team of favouring Alonso, but the reasons why his 2004 season deteriorated have never been properly identified. He was sacked three races before the end of the season and replaced by  World Champion Jacques Villeneuve, despite leading his teammate in the championship at that point. Trulli had already agreed to drive for Toyota in 2005, and his early exit from Renault allowed him to take up his new seat for the last two races of the 2004 season, replacing Ricardo Zonta.

Toyota (2004–2009)

2004–2005
In 2005, early season podiums demonstrated Trulli's speed and at Indianapolis he took Toyota's first Formula One pole. However, he, his teammate and the majority of the grid, did not enter the race due to using Michelin tyres, which were not safe to race. For the vast majority of the year he outpaced his highly paid teammate Ralf Schumacher, but a late season dip in form saw him slip to seventh in the championship, two points behind the German.

2006
In , Trulli suffered a very poor start to the season. Trulli was racing very well in the season finale at Interlagos, but his car suffered suspension failure in the first 10 laps, a fate which befell his teammate at the same time. He finished 12th overall.

2007

Monaco brought no better fortune for Trulli, as he finished down in 15th place, just ahead of teammate Schumacher, after qualifying his season-worst 14th. Points were collected by Trulli at the Indianapolis for 6th place. After a series of non-scoring runs, Trulli said that the result was 'incredible'. He also qualified well for the  but crashed with the Renault of Heikki Kovalainen on the opening lap, and duly retired because of the damage. Trulli accepted the blame for the incident. The second half of the season was disappointing with Trulli's only point coming in the final race of the season at Brazil.

Trulli finished the championship in 13th position, collecting only 8 points. Post season there had been reports that Trulli's contract was not safe, and that he may have been replaced in the Toyota team for 2008 by Heikki Kovalainen. These proved unfounded as Kovalainen signed for McLaren.

2008

In , Trulli was hoping Toyota would make a big step forward. Timo Glock was confirmed as his teammate for the season. Trulli started the season quite well, with several points scoring finishes, the height of which was a fourth-place finish in Malaysia. Trulli's qualifying performances were also very good throughout the first few rounds of the Championship. His form then slumped a little, with disappointing performances in Turkey and Monaco, as he finished in non-points scoring positions.

However, he bounced back from this with a 6th-place finish in Montreal. He then topped that in France by finishing on the podium in 3rd place, holding off the challenge of Heikki Kovalainen and Robert Kubica in the closing laps.

He qualified on the front row alongside pole-sitter Felipe Massa for the season-ending , which was to decide the 2008 world championship between Massa and Lewis Hamilton. During the race, Trulli had several close shaves in the changeable weather conditions, and eventually finished 8th. His teammate Glock played a pivotal part in the title outcome as he was passed by Hamilton on the last corner of the race, which gave the Englishman the championship by one point from Massa, who won easily. Trulli finished the 8th in Drivers' Championship standings, collecting 31 points, 4 more than his teammate.

2009

Trulli was confident going into . In the first race of the 2009 season, the Toyotas of Trulli and Glock started the race from the pitlane as their qualifying times were disallowed due to Toyota's flexible rear wing breaching regulations. Although Trulli started from the pit lane, he finished in an impressive 3rd place before being penalised 25 seconds, dropping him to 12th position for passing Lewis Hamilton under the safety car. A few days after this decision, Hamilton was disqualified from the race results for 'misleading' the race stewards by insisting that Jarno Trulli had passed him under the Safety Car although Hamilton in fact let him pass on purpose due to an order given by the team from the pitlane. Jarno Trulli therefore regained his third-place finish. However he did record the fastest lap, the only time he has achieved this in his career. He holds the record of having started the most Grands Prix before recording a fastest lap.

He crashed out of the  after being forced off the track at the second corner and being collected by Adrian Sutil, and then had a poor performance in Monaco as the Toyotas qualified on the back row of the grid. Improvements saw him score points in three of the next four races, before the following four rounds saw him struggle again as he failed to finish in the Top 10. At the  he placed 12th while teammate Glock was second. Trulli then fought back at the  – which would prove to be Toyota's last home race – by qualifying and finishing second. 

He then qualified fourth in torrential conditions in Brazil, but like in Spain collided with Adrian Sutil on the opening lap of the race, an incident which enraged Trulli as he blamed Sutil for the crash. His obvious display of anger towards Sutil (who also retired) afterwards earned him a $10,000 fine. Trulli finished seventh at the season finale in Abu Dhabi scoring his final points in Toyota F1's last race.

Lotus (2010–2011)

2010

On 14 December 2009, Trulli was confirmed as one of the newly formed Lotus team's drivers, joining former McLaren driver Heikki Kovalainen. He only finished one of the opening four races, a weaker reliability record than Kovalainen, leading him to note that "everything happens on my car and my car only – so to this day, my expectations have not been met".

At the launch of the Lotus T127, Trulli admitted in an interview with Autosport that US F1 and Sauber had been in contact with him. In late 2009, Trulli was asked to test a NASCAR stock car in North America for Toyota. The car was set up by Michael Waltrip Racing.

2011

He again partnered Heikki Kovalainen.

Trulli's season started with thirteenth in Australia, before a retirement with a clutch problem in Malaysia. Trulli finished each of the next six races, equalling his best season finish of thirteenth in Monaco. In Britain, he retired with an oil leak. When he returned in Hungary, he retired due to a water leak; his teammate Kovalainen retired some laps later with an identical problem. After retiring in Singapore with a gearbox failure, Trulli finished 19th in Japan, 17th in Korea and 19th again, in India.

Caterham (2012)

Team Lotus was renamed to Caterham F1 ahead of the 2012 season. Trulli drove in one pre-season test, but on 17 February 2012 it was announced that Trulli was replaced by Vitaly Petrov. Following, Trulli stated that he was "really proud" to have helped Caterham become a Formula One team. 

This left Formula One without an Italian driver at the start of the 2012 season, for the first time since .

FIA Formula E Championship

In 2014–15 season Trulli drove in the inaugural FIA Formula E Championship for his own team Trulli GP in partnership with Drayson Racing Technologies and Super Nova Racing, as announced on 18 June 2014. After failing to pass scrutineering of their new drivetrain for the first two races of the 2015–16 season, the team withdrew from the championship.

Racing record

Career summary

Complete Formula One results
(key) (Races in bold indicate pole position; races in italics indicate fastest lap)

 Half points awarded as less than 75% of race distance was completed.
 Trulli did not finish the Grand Prix, but was classified as he had completed over 90% of the race distance.

Complete Formula E results
(key) (Races in bold indicate pole position; races in italics indicate fastest lap)

† Driver did not finish the race, but was classified as he completed more than 90% of the race distance.

Pre-Formula One career
1996: Champion in German Formula 3 (KMS Dallara-Opel)
1995: 4th in German Formula 3 (KMS Dallara-Opel), 1st in Italian Karting class 100 FA, 1st in World karting class 125FC, Senna Memorial World Cup winner
1994: Senna Memorial World Cup winner, 1st in North American class 100SA, 1st in European class 100SA
1993: 2nd in World karting Champion class 100 SA, 1st in Grand prix of Japan Class 100 FSA
1992: 2nd in World karting class 125 FC
1991: Champion in Karting World Championship 100 FK
1990: 1st in Grand Prix of Hong Kong Class 100 FA
1988–1990: Three times Champion in Italian National 100 Class
1983–1995: Karting

Helmet

Trulli's original helmet design was white with a blue shape around the visor with a blue circle in the top and a green J with a red T in the sides. A ring around the blue circle was incorporated when he raced at Jordan and Renault, being coloured after the team's main sponsor. In 2004 his helmet changed from white to chromed silver and the shape, the J and the T became chromed with black outline. Later, in his first Toyota years the top became red and was added a white ring around the red circle. Finally in 2008 the helmet turned red with the J and the T of the original colours (and white outline) plus a white line on the chin area. From his Lotus years, the helmet design remained intact, with the change of the shades of colour from chromed to normal shades (the chromed silver becomes white).

Personal life
Trulli is married to Barbara and they have two sons, Enzo Trulli (b. 2005), named after Trulli's father, and Marco (b. 2006), and a daughter Veronica (b. 2014). He is the co-owner of a vineyard in the Abruzzo region in Italy and produces his own wine. He also has his own range of Karts named 'Trulli Kart'; Trulli himself was a World Champion at Karting level. His son Enzo is also pursuing career in motorsports he competed in the WSK karting series, before starting single seater racing in F4 UAE in 2021, and for 2022 at present in FIA Formula 3 Championship.

See also
List of celebrities who own wineries and vineyards

References

External links

 
 
Jarno Trulli Revealed on CNN.com

1974 births
Living people
Sportspeople from Pescara
Italian expatriate sportspeople in Switzerland
Italian expatriate sportspeople in the United Kingdom
Italian expatriates in Monaco
Italian racing drivers
Karting World Championship drivers
Formula One race winners
German Formula Three Championship drivers
Italian Formula One drivers
Jordan Formula One drivers
Minardi Formula One drivers
Prost Formula One drivers
Renault Formula One drivers
Toyota Formula One drivers
Team Lotus (2010–11) Formula One drivers
Formula E drivers
Formula E team owners
People named in the Panama Papers
British Formula Three Championship drivers
Italian Formula Three Championship drivers
RC Motorsport drivers
Super Nova Racing drivers